Agriculture Training Institute is a combined government technical college in Noakhali, a city in Bangladesh. It was established in 1947. It is situated in Chowrasta, Begumganj Upazila, Noakhali. This is an Agricultural Diploma institute.

History 
The school, in the center of Begumganj Upazila, was established in 1947. Initially the school conducted only one shift.

Facilities
The school has three academic buildings, an administrative building. There is a field in the school arena. Other facilities include workshop, auditorium, canteen, and library. There are fifty teachers and twenty staff. The school has two laboratories.

Extracurricular activities 
 BNCC (Bangladesh National Cadet Core)
 Scouting
 Games and sports (mostly athletics, cricket, Badminton and football)
 Debating
 Math and language competitions.
 Picnic
 Social Development

See also
 Education in Bangladesh
 List of educational institutions in Noakhali
 List of schools in Bangladesh

References
https://web.archive.org/web/20140222202122/http://www.dae.gov.bd/office_Agriculture%20Training%20Instutes.aspx
https://web.archive.org/web/20140222142838/http://atibn.jimdo.com/

Colleges in Noakhali District
Begumganj Upazila